The Louisiana and Northwest Railroad  is a short-line railroad headquartered in Homer, Louisiana.

LNW operates a  line in Arkansas and Louisiana from McNeil, Arkansas (where it interchanges with Union Pacific Railroad), to Gibsland, Louisiana (where it interchanges with Kansas City Southern Railway).  The  section from McNeil to Magnolia, Arkansas, is leased from Union Pacific.

LNW was incorporated in 1889.  On June 10, 2008, Patriot Rail Corporation announced that it had purchased LNW for an undisclosed amount.

References

External links
Link to Union Pacific Website with LNW Details

Louisiana railroads
Arkansas railroads
Railway companies established in 1889
Patriot Rail Company
1889 establishments in Louisiana
Transportation in Columbia County, Arkansas
Claiborne Parish, Louisiana